Husby Chapel is a chapel of the Church of Norway in Nesna Municipality in Nordland county, Norway. It is located in the village of Husby on the southern shore of the island of Tomma. It is an annex chapel in the Nesna parish which is part of the Nord-Helgeland prosti (deanery) in the Diocese of Sør-Hålogaland.

The white, wooden chapel was built in a long church style in 1905 as a private farm chapel for the Husby Estate. The chapel seats about 60 people. It was consecrated on 2 June 1905 as part of the Dønnes parish and had 4 worship services each year. It was transferred to Nesna parish in 1962, and since 2005, it has six regularly scheduled worship services each year in addition to special events such as weddings or funerals.

See also
List of churches in Sør-Hålogaland

References

Nesna
Churches in Nordland
Wooden churches in Norway
20th-century Church of Norway church buildings
Churches completed in 1905
1905 establishments in Norway